is a Japanese publisher that specializes in games and, especially, logic puzzles. Nikoli is also the nickname of a quarterly magazine (whose full name is Puzzle Communication Nikoli) issued by the company in Tokyo. Nikoli was established in 1980 and became prominent worldwide with the popularity of Sudoku.

The name "Nikoli" comes from the racehorse who won the Irish 2,000 Guineas in 1980; the founder of Nikoli, Maki Kaji, was fond of horseracing and betting.

Nikoli's claim to fame is its vast library of "culture independent" puzzles. An example of a language/culture-dependent genre of puzzle would be the crossword, which relies on a specific language and alphabet. For this reason Nikoli's puzzles are often purely logical, and often numerical.

Nikoli's Sudoku, the most popular logic problem in Japan, was popularized in the English-speaking world in 2005, though that game has a history stretching back hundreds of years and across the globe.

The magazine has invented several new genres of puzzles, and introduced several new games to Japan.

Nikoli puzzles 

Some of the popular Nikoli puzzles, along with their Japanese names; terms in parentheses are published English titles for the same puzzles.

 (Corral)
 (dot to dots)

 (Paint by Numbers, Nonogram, Griddler)
 (Allied Occupation)
 (Slant)
 (Go Stones)
 (Bridges)

 (Cross Sums, Kakro)

 (Cell Structure)

 (Divide by Squares)
 (Fences)

 (Number Place, Nine Numbers)

 (Galaxies)

 (Alphametics, Cryptarithm)
 (Word seek)
 (Arrow Ring)

References

External links 
Official site 
Rules of 80+ Nikoli Puzzles in German and English

1980 establishments in Japan
Japanese companies established in 1980
Logic puzzles
Puzzle designers
Magazine publishing companies of Japan
Book publishing companies in Tokyo